The Wheat Chiefs were a Canadian melodic rock band with punk rock influence formed in 1990 in Edmonton, and later relocated to Vancouver. The group featured several members of SNFU and one from Jr. Gone Wild.  They released their only album, Redeemer, in 1996, before disbanding two years later.

History

Early years (1990–1992)
Late in 1989, guitarists and twin brothers Marc and Brent Belke disbanded their influential skate punk band SNFU due to a growing rift with singer Ken Chinn and their desire to experiment with playing different kinds of music. Several months later, the brothers formed the new band The Ship of Fools with SNFU bassist Curtis Creager and longtime acquaintance Dave Rees playing drums. With Marc Belke acting as lead vocalist, the band departed from the punk sound of SNFU by playing melodic alternative rock. After their initial string of performances, they renamed themselves the Wheat Chiefs. The members later remembered the early Wheat Chiefs songs as "kinda lengthy."

Bassist Trent Buhler, a former member of Rees's group Broken Smiles, replaced Creager early in 1990. The group recorded a demo cassette to pitch to record industry representatives and embarked on several Canadian tours. Their track "Redeem" was included on Thrasher Skate Rock Volume 10, issued by Thrasher magazine in 1991. The Belkes reformed SNFU in September 1991, while Rees and Buhler departed the Wheat Chiefs early in 1992 to form the new band Cowboy Dick.

New lineup (1992–1996)
Despite the reformation of SNFU, the Belkes kept the Wheat Chiefs active. Drummer Ed Dobek (of Jr. Gone Wild and the pre-SNFU band Live Sex Shows) and bassist Rob Johnson (a former Wheat Chiefs roadie and future SNFU member) completed the new lineup. This incarnation debuted with a short tour, and recorded several new tracks with producers Marek Forysinski and Dave Ogilvie. Brent Belke later remembered the new Wheat Chiefs material as "quicker and more straight ahead; it was great."

The band was active sporadically in the time that followed, with a major run of touring coming in 1993. Later this year, the band recorded the track "Joe Murphy" (named for the professional ice hockey player of the same name) with Ogilvie and returning guest drummer Rees, now a member of SNFU. The track was included on the Puck Rock Volume 1 compilation, a full disc of hockey-related punk rock songs assembled by John Wright of The Hanson Brothers and NoMeansNo. The Wheat Chiefs received a seven-figure recording contract offer from Mercury Records, but rejected this in anticipation of a better deal, which they never received. Early in 1994, the group re-recorded two songs from their demo cassette, again with Rees returning as a guest. Now signed to Epitaph Records, SNFU remained heavily active over the next two years while Wheat Chiefs activity lessened.

Redeemer and breakup (1996–1998)
After spending two years focusing mainly on SNFU, Johnson and the Belkes returned to full-time Wheat Chiefs rehearsals early in 1996. Culled from three recording sessions held in 1992 and 1994, the Redeemer album was released later this year through BangOn Records, a subsidiary of the Canadian Cargo Records imprint. They promoted the album with tours of Canada and the United States, the largest in the band's career.

In 1997, drummer Dan Moyse replaced Dobek. The Wheat Chiefs continued to perform sporadically, but the members' careers were dealt a blow late that year when SNFU's contract with Epitaph expired. The Wheat Chiefs ultimately disbanded following Brent Belke's decision to quit both bands and pursue work in music composition for film and television. They played a final gig on March 28, 1998, at a festival in Edmonton.

Members

Marc Belke – vocals, guitar (1990–1998)
Brent Belke – guitar, vocals (1990–1998)
Curtis Creager – bass (1990)
Dave Rees – drums (1990–1992, 1994)
Trent Buhler – bass, vocals (1990–1992)
Rob Johnson – bass, vocals (1992–1998)
Ed Dobek – drums (1992–1997)
Dan Moyse – drums (1997–1998)

Timeline

Discography

Albums
Redeemer (1996, BangOn Records/Hom Wreckerds Music)

Demo cassettes
Wheat Chiefs (1991, self-released)

Compilation appearances
Thrasher Skate Rock Volume 10 (1991)
Puck Rock Volume 1 (1993, Wrong Records)
Edmonton Rocks Volume 1 (1997)

References

External links 
Wheat Chiefs at CBC Radio3

1990 establishments in Alberta
1998 disestablishments in British Columbia
Canadian punk rock groups
Musical groups established in 1990
Musical groups disestablished in 1998
Musical groups from Edmonton
Sibling musical groups